Tama County  is a county located in the U.S. state of Iowa. As of the 2020 census, the population was 17,135. Its county seat is Toledo. The county was formed on February 17, 1843 and named for Taimah, a leader of the Meskwaki Indians.

Geography

Major highways
 U.S. Highway 30
 U.S. Highway 63
 Iowa Highway 8
 Iowa Highway 21
 Iowa Highway 96
 Iowa Highway 146

Adjacent counties
Grundy County  (northwest)
Black Hawk County  (northeast)
Benton County  (east)
Poweshiek County  (south)
Marshall County  (west)
Iowa County (southeast)
Jasper County (southwest)

Demographics

2020 census
There were 7,575 housing units, of which 6,784 were occupied.

2010 census
There were 7,766 housing units, of which 6,947 were occupied.

2000 census
	
As of the census of 2000, there were 17,767 people, 7,018 households, and 4,968 families residing in the county.  The population density was 25 people per square mile (10/km2).  There were 7,583 housing units at an average density of 10 per square mile (4/km2).  The racial makeup of the county was 90.38% White, 0.25% Black or African American, 6.09% Native American, 0.18% Asian, 0.02% Pacific Islander, 1.90% from other races, and 1.18% from two or more races.  3.75% of the population were Hispanic or Latino of any race.

There were 7,018 households, out of which 31.60% had children under the age of 18 living with them, 59.20% were married couples living together, 8.00% had a female householder with no husband present, and 29.20% were non-families. 25.30% of all households were made up of individuals, and 13.70% had someone living alone who was 65 years of age or older.  The average household size was 2.51 and the average family size was 3.01.

In the county, the population was spread out, with 26.60% under the age of 18, 7.00% from 18 to 24, 25.20% from 25 to 44, 22.50% from 45 to 64, and 18.70% who were 65 years of age or older.  The median age was 39 years. For every 100 females there were 96.60 males.  For every 100 females age 18 and over, there were 92.50 males.

The median income for a household in the county was $37,419, and the median income for a family was $43,646. Males had a median income of $30,723 versus $22,597 for females. The per capita income for the county was $17,097.  About 7.60% of families and 10.50% of the population were below the poverty line, including 14.50% of those under age 18 and 9.40% of those age 65 or over.

Education
School districts include:
 Belle Plaine Community School District
 Benton Community School District
 East Marshall Community School District
 GMG Community School District
 Gladbrook-Reinbeck Community School District
 Grundy Center Community School District
 North Tama County Community School District
 South Tama County Community School District
 Union Community School District

There is also a Bureau of Indian Education (BIE)-affiliated tribal school, Meskwaki Settlement School.

The largest of which is South Tama Community School District, at the 3A designation. Second largest is North Tama Community Schools. Lastly both GMG and Meskwaki Settlement School with an eight-man designation.

Communities

Cities

Chelsea
Clutier
Dysart
Elberon
Garwin
Gladbrook
Le Grand
Lincoln
Montour
Tama
Toledo
Traer
Vining

Unincorporated communities
Buckingham
Long Point
Meskwaki Settlement

Townships
Tama County is divided into twenty-one townships:

 Buckingham
 Carlton
 Carroll
 Clark
 Columbia
 Crystal
 Geneseo
 Grant
 Highland
 Howard
 Indian Village
 Lincoln
 Oneida
 Otter Creek
 Perry
 Richland
 Salt Creek
 Spring Creek
 Tama
 Toledo
 York

Population ranking
The population ranking of the following table is based on the 2020 census of Tama County.

† county seat

Notable people
George R. Struble (1836–1918). Iowa judge and politician from Toledo. Speaker of the Iowa House of Representatives, 1881–1883. Ardent prohibitionist. Brother of John T. Struble of Johnson County, and Congressman Isaac S. Struble of Plymouth County.  Biography in the Journal of the House, memorial resolution of 3/23/1921.
Michael Emerson, born in Cedar Rapids and  raised in Toledo, Emerson has been on Broadway and appeared on Lost.
Clifford Berry (1918-1963), born in Gladbrook, was a graduate student at Iowa State when he and John Vincent Atanasoff created the Atanasoff–Berry Computer (ABC), the first digital electronic computer, in 1939.

Politics

See also

National Register of Historic Places listings in Tama County, Iowa

References

External links

IAGenWeb History, Biographies, Records and more

 
Iowa placenames of Native American origin
1843 establishments in Iowa Territory
Populated places established in 1843